Karalis is a Greek surname. Notable people with the surname include:

 Emmanouil Karalis (born 1999), Greek pole vaulter
 Giannis Karalis (born 1988), Greek professional footballer
 Tom Karalis (born 1964), Canadian-American former ice hockey defenceman

Greek-language surnames